Cryphia pallidioides is a species of moth in the family Noctuidae (the owlet moths). It is found in North America.

The MONA or Hodges number for Cryphia pallidioides is 9293.

References

Further reading

 
 
 

Cryphia
Articles created by Qbugbot
Moths described in 1989